Sewal Fraunceys (fl. 1380–1386) of Bath, Somerset, was an English politician.

He was a Member (MP) of the Parliament of England for Bath in January 1380, October 1383 and 1386.

References

14th-century births
Year of death missing
English MPs January 1380
People from Bath, Somerset
English MPs October 1383
English MPs 1386